Berat District was one of the 36 districts of Albania, which were dissolved in July 2000 and replaced by 12 counties. It is in the centre of the country, and its capital was the city of Berat. Another large population centre in this district was Ura Vajgurore. Its territory is now part of Berat County: the municipalities of Berat, Dimal, Poliçan (partly) and Kuçovë (partly).

This is also the birthplace of Sejfi Protopapa, a Balli Kombëtar leader.

Administrative divisions 

The district consisted of the following municipalities:

Berat
Cukalat
Kutalli
Lumas
Otllak
Poshnjë
Roshnik
Sinjë
Tërpan
Ura Vajgurore
Velabisht
Vërtop

References 

Districts of Albania
Geography of Berat County